Catriona Kennedy is a senior lecturer at the University of York and director of the Center for Eighteenth Century Studies. Kennedy specialises in British and Irish history with research interests in the cultural history of war, politics, gender and national identity.

Kennedy was part of the expert panel for the discussion of the Gordon Riots on BBC Radio 4's In Our Time in May 2019.

Selected publications

References 

Academics of the University of York
British women historians